Sainte-Anne-du-Lac Water Aerodrome  is located on Lake Tapani in Sainte-Anne-du-Lac, Quebec, Canada.

References

Registered aerodromes in Laurentides
Seaplane bases in Quebec